The Texas A&M–Commerce Lions basketball program consists of:

Texas A&M–Commerce Lions men's basketball
Texas A&M–Commerce Lions women's basketball